Suffield is a town in Hartford County, Connecticut, United States. It was once within the boundaries of Massachusetts. The town is located in the Connecticut River Valley with the town of Enfield neighboring to the east. As of the 2020 census, the population was 15,752. The town center is a census-designated place listed as Suffield Depot in U.S. Census records.

Bordering Massachusetts, Suffield is part of the Springfield, Massachusetts NECTA.

History

Originally known as Southfield—pronounced "Suffield," on May 20, 1674, the committee for the settling of the town petitioned:

The petition was granted by the Massachusetts Bay court on June 8, 1674. Suffield was incorporated as a town in March 1682.

Also, on early 17th and 18th century maps, Suffield was alternatively spelled as Suthfield.

Suffield and the surrounding area were part of the Equivalent Lands compromise with Massachusetts in 1715–1716.

Suffield's native and adopted sons include The Rev. Ebenezer Gay, a renowned Congregational minister; U.S. Postmaster General Gideon Granger; real estate speculator Oliver Phelps, once the largest landowner in America; composer Timothy Swan; architect Henry A. Sykes; sculptor Olin Levi Warner; Seth Pease, surveyor of the Western Reserve lands in Ohio, most of which were controlled by Suffield financiers and speculators; and Thaddeus Leavitt, inventor of an early cotton gin, merchant and patentee of the Western Reserve lands. Thanks to the town's early prominence and wealth, it boasts an astonishing collection of early New England architecture. The Kent family, for whom the town's library is named, originated in Gloucester, Massachusetts, and boasted relations to many prominent early New England families, including the Dwight family of Northampton, Massachusetts, the Hooker family of Hartford, the Dudleys of Guilford, Connecticut, and the Leavitts of Suffield. Descendants of Robert Olds, who arrived from Sherborne, Dorset, in 1667, include automotive pioneer Ransom Eli Olds, Copperhead Ohio politician Edson Baldwin Olds, his great-grandson USAAF General Robert Olds, and his son, iconic USAF fighter pilot Robin Olds.

Slavery was common throughout the Connecticut River Valley during the 18th century, and the 1774 Census for the Colony of Connecticut listed 37 slaves in Suffield. Throughout the Connecticut valley, wealthy merchants, tavern owners and town ministers owned slaves. When Major John Pynchon originally purchased from the Pequonnocks and Agawam tribes a six-mile tract of land, which he called Stoney Brooke Plantation, he first ordered the construction of a sawmill, and used two of his slaves, Harry and Roco, for the construction. Suffield's third minister, Reverend Ebenezer Devotion, became minister in 1710, and "sixteen years later the town voted to give him £20 to purchase a slave. Reverend Ebenezer Gay, Devotion's successor, owned six slaves throughout his long term, 1742–1796. Reverend Ebenezer Gay Jr. manumitted his family's three remaining slaves in 1812. They were Titus, Ginny and Dinah. "Princess," a slave belonging to early Suffield settler, Lieut. Joshua Leavitt, died November 5, 1732. Some of Leavitt's descendants became ardent abolitionists, including Joshua Leavitt and his cousin Roger Hooker Leavitt, who operated an Underground Railroad station in Charlemont, Massachusetts.

One of the earliest graduates of the Yale Medical School was one of Suffield's earliest physicians. Dr. Asaph Leavitt Bissell, born in 1791 at Hanover, New Hampshire, to parents originally from Suffield, attended Dartmouth College, and later graduated in the second class of the Yale Medical School. Bissell moved to Suffield, where he rode horseback to make house calls on his patients. Bissell's saddlebags are today in the collection of the Yale Medical School's Historical Society.

Geography

Two bridges span the river to the town of Enfield: the Amtrak/Springfield Terminal Railroad Bridge and the Enfield–Suffield Veterans Bridge.

The Metacomet Ridge, a mountainous trap rock ridgeline that stretches from Long Island Sound to nearly the Vermont border, runs through the center of Suffield from south to north as West Suffield Mountain. The  Metacomet Trail traverses the ridge.

Demographics

As of the census of 2000, there were 13,552 people, 4,660 households, and 3,350 families residing in the town. The racial makeup of the town was 88.67% White, 6.95% African American, 0.24% Native American, 0.94% Asian, 0.04% Pacific Islander, 2.03% from other races, and 1.13% from two or more races. Hispanic or Latino of any race were 4.25% of the population.

There were 4,660 households, out of which 32.8% had children under the age of 18 living with them, 62.2% were married couples living together, 6.9% had a female householder with no husband present, and 28.1% were non-families. 23.3% of all households were made up of individuals, and 11.6% had someone living alone who was 65 years of age or older.  The average household size was 2.55 and the average family size was 3.04.

In the town, the population was spread out, with 22.1% under the age of 18, 8.0% from 18 to 24, 31.7% from 25 to 44, 24.1% from 45 to 64, and 14.1% who were 65 years of age or older.  The median age was 39 years. For every 100 females, there were 116.9 males.  For every 100 females age 18 and over, there were 121.1 males.

The median income for a household in the town was $66,698, and the median income for a family was $79,189. Males had a median income of $52,096 versus $35,188 for females. The per capita income for the town was $28,171.  About 1.8% of families and 3.6% of the population were below the poverty line, including 2.5% of those under age 18 and 6.2% of those age 65 or over.

Education
The town's public school system, Suffield Public Schools, includes Spaulding Elementary School, McAlister Intermediate School, Suffield Middle School, and Suffield High School.

Suffield is also the home of Suffield Academy, a private coeducational preparatory school.

Government and politics

List of First Selectmen

Historic homes and sites

Main Street, a designated historic district with the Green, three churches, Suffield Academy and vintage colonial and Victorian homes, typifies a New England town. Named for the Kent family of Suffield, the Kent Memorial Library is an important research center for source materials, records, and documents from north-central Connecticut. A walk along Main Street reveals many examples of 18th and 19th century architecture. The Dr. Alexander King House, on the corner of Kent Avenue, and the Phelps-Hatheway House, a little farther north on Main Street, are museums open to the public from May to October.

Historic sites

The town includes 11 historic sites that are listed on the National Register of Historic Places:
 Alexander King House – 232 S. Main St. (added 1976)
 Babb's Beach – 435 Babb's Rd. (added 2006)
 Farmington Canal-New Haven and Northampton Canal – Roughly from Suffield to New Haven (added 1985)
 Gothic Cottage – 1425 Mapleton Ave. (added 1982)
 Hastings Hill Historic District – 987–1308 Hill St., 1242 Spruce St. and 1085-1162 Russell Ave. (added 1979)
 Hatheway House (also known as "Phelps-Hatheway House & Garden") – 55 S. Main St., reflects two architectural styles: the original 1761 building is a typical colonial house, the 1794 north wing is one of the first examples of the Neoclassical style in the Connecticut River Valley (added September 6, 1975)
 Hilltop Farm – 1550–1760 Mapleton Ave. (added 2005)
 John Fuller House – 463 Halladay Ave. (added 1982)
 King's Field House – 827 North St. (added 1982)
 Lewis-Zukowski House – 1095 S. Grand St. (added 1990)
 Suffield Historic District – Runs along North and South Main Streets (added 1979)

Notable people

 Willis Seaver Adams (1842–1921), landscape painter and part of the Tonalism movement which took place in the late 19th century; born in Suffield
 Ran Blake, pianist
 Selden M. Bronson, former Wisconsin State Assemblyman
 Sylvester Graham (1794–1851), American dietary reformer; born in Suffield
 Amos P. Granger, former US Congressman
 Francis Granger, former US Congressman and Postmaster General
 Gideon Granger, former US Postmaster General
 Judson Worthington Hastings (1853–1923), physician and public official
 Chris Kellogg, current morning host of The Kellogg Krew morning show on WMAS-FM
 W. Bruce Lincoln, scholar of Russian history
 Thaddeus J. Martin. Major General in the United States Air Force and Connecticut Adjutant General
 David Newton Sheldon, 5th President of Colby College
 Israel Smith (1759–1810), served as a member of the United States House of Representatives, a member of the United States Senate and Governor of Vermont; born in Suffield
 Noah Smith (1756–1812), brother of Israel Smith, Justice of the Vermont Supreme Court 
 Timothy Swan (1758–1842), composer and hatmaker; resident of Suffield
 Emily Sweeney, member of 2018 US Olympic luger team
 John Tod (1779–1830), United States Congressman for Pennsylvania

References

External links

Town of Suffield official website
Suffield Historical Society

 
Towns in Hartford County, Connecticut
Connecticut populated places on the Connecticut River
Towns in Connecticut
Springfield metropolitan area, Massachusetts
Greater Hartford